Foster Langsdorf (born December 14, 1995) is an American former professional soccer player.  After a very successful collegiate career at Stanford, he played for several teams over the course of five seasons.  Most of is appearances were for Portland Timbers 2; he made a total of four appearances for Portland Timbers and Minnesota United of Major League Soccer.

Career

Youth and college 
Langsdorf played four years of college soccer for Stanford, winning three NCAA Division I Men's Soccer Championships in the process. While at college, Langsdorf also appeared for USL Premier Development League sides Portland Timbers U23s and San Francisco City FC.

Professional 
A product of the Portland Timbers Academy, Langsdorf signed a homegrown contract with the Portland Timbers on January 19, 2018.

Langsdorf made his Timbers debut against the San Jose Earthquakes in a fourth-round Open Cup match on June 6, 2018.

Following his release by Portland at the end of their 2019 season, Langsdorf moved to USL Championship side Reno 1868 on January 24, 2020.

On October 30, 2020, following the 2020 USL Championship season, Langsforf signed a deal with Major League Soccer side Minnesota United ahead of their upcoming playoff fixtures.

Following a string of injuries to their attacking options, Langsdorf joined the Tampa Bay Rowdies on loan on 2 June 2021 and debuted that same day as a substitute during Tampa Bay's 1–0 win at New York Red Bulls II.

On July 27, 2021, Langsdorf announced his retirement.

Career statistics

Club

Honors

Individual 
 Pac-12 Conference Men's Soccer Player of the Year (2): 2016, 2017

Club 
 Stanford
NCAA Division I Men's Soccer Championship (3): 2015, 2016, 2017
 Pac-12 Conference (4): 2014, 2015, 2016, 2017

References

External links 
 
 PDL Profile
 Stanford Profile
 

1995 births
All-American men's college soccer players
American soccer players
Association football forwards
Homegrown Players (MLS)
Living people
Major League Soccer players
Minnesota United FC players
NCAA Division I Men's Soccer Tournament Most Outstanding Player winners
Portland Timbers players
Portland Timbers 2 players
Portland Timbers U23s players
Reno 1868 FC players
San Francisco City FC players
Soccer players from Portland, Oregon
Soccer players from Washington (state)
Sportspeople from Vancouver, Washington
Stanford Cardinal men's soccer players
Tampa Bay Rowdies players
USL Championship players
USL League Two players